Bothale Ihalagama is a village nearby Mirigama, Gampaha District, Western Province, Sri Lanka. It is 4  km from Mirigama and 7  km from Warakapola. Bothale Ihalagama is the home of Sri Lanka's first Prime Minister D.S. Senanayake.

Notable places
 Bothale Walawwa
 Unudiya ella
  Kinithulagala Aranya Senasanaya 
 Kinthulagala Aranya Senasana is a Theravada Tripitaka teaching seminary affiliated with the Sri Kalyani Yogashrama Corporation and is located in the Vilikulakanda Reserve.

Temples
Within Bothale Ihalagama is Sri Ghotabhaya Rajamaha Viharaya. Built by King Ghotabhaya, it is one of Sri Lankan's oldest temples.

Schools

Bothale Kanishta Vidyalaya is a school within Bothale Ihalagama.

Gallery

References

Populated places in Western Province, Sri Lanka
Populated places in Sri Lanka